Aktogay District may also refer to:
 Aktogay District, Pavlodar Province, a district of Pavlodar Province in Kazakhstan
 Aktogay District, Karagandy Province, a district of Karagandy Province in Kazakhstan

District name disambiguation pages